Carolina Alves and María Carlé were the defending champions but chose not to participate.

Ingrid Gamarra Martins and Francisca Jorge won the title, defeating Anna Rogers and Christina Rosca in the final, 6–4, 6–3.

Seeds

Draw

Draw

References

External Links
Main Draw

Aberto da República - Doubles